Appasamy Navaneethakrishnan is an Indian politician and lawyer. He is a Member of Parliament, representing Tamil Nadu in the Rajya Sabha the upper house of India's Parliament.He is the leader of the AIADMK party in the Rajya Sabha. He was the earlier the Advocate General of Tamil Nadu.He was the defence lawyer for Jayalalithaa in various corruption cases.

References

Rajya Sabha members from Tamil Nadu
All India Anna Dravida Munnetra Kazhagam politicians
Living people
1956 births
People from Thanjavur district